Voukolies is a town and former municipality in the Chania regional unit, Crete, Greece. Since the 2011 local government reform it is part of the municipality Platanias, of which it is a municipal unit. It was part of the former Kissamos province which covered the northwestern part of Chania Prefecture. Voukoulies is a large village with an important Saturday morning market. The municipal unit of Voukoulies extends from Tavronitis on the north coast to the foothills of the White Mountains (Lefka Ori). The seat of the municipality was Voukolies itself. The municipal unit also includes Tavronitis, Neriana, Kakopetros, Polemarchi, Neo Chorio, Anoskeli and Palea Roumata.

See also
List of communities of Chania

References

External links
Municipality Description
GTP Description

Populated places in Chania (regional unit)